The 5th season of the television series Arthur was originally broadcast on PBS in the United States from September 25 to November 27, 2000 and contains 10 episodes. The special "Arthur's Perfect Christmas" served as the finale to this season. Steven Crowder replaced Luke Reid as Brain. This is the last season where Michael Yarmush voices Arthur due to his voice changing. Starting in season 9, he returns to voice the character Slink, one of the Tough Customers. Yarmush additionally will return to play Arthur one more time in the final episode of the series, "All Grown Up" by voicing the character's adult self. This is also the last season where Ricky Mabe voices Timmy Tibble due to his voice changing as well. Alex Trebek guest starred as Alex Lebek on the season premiere "Arthur and the Big Riddle".

Peter Moss replaced Carol Greenwood and Micheline Charest as executive producer and Lesley Taylor stepped in for Cassandra Schafhausen when she replaced Ronald A. Weinberg as producer. Head writers Joe Fallon and Ken Scarborough also left to work on Between the Lions, although Joe Fallon was still credited as executive story editor in this season along with Joseph Purdy. When this season was nominated for a Daytime Emmy, only Joseph Purdy, Peter K. Hirsch, Kathy Waugh, Dietrich Smith, and Bruce Akiyama were nominated as writers of Arthur.

This season won a Daytime Emmy for Outstanding Children's Animated Program. It was also nominated for Outstanding Achievement in Sound Mixing - Special Class. In 2001, it won a Peabody Award.

Episodes

References

General references 
 
 
 
 

2000 American television seasons
Arthur (TV series) seasons
2000 Canadian television seasons